Ruben Delgado is a paralympic athlete from Spain competing mainly in category T11 distance running events.

Ruben competed in the 1996 and 2000 Summer Paralympics winning one medal.  That medal came in the 800m in 1996 where he finished in third behind compatriots José Antonio Sánchez (gold) and José Saura (silver), he also finished fourth in the 1500m but dropped out of the 5000m.  In the 2000 games he missed the final of 800m by eight hundredths of a second and finished fourth in the 1500m.

References

External links
 

Year of birth missing (living people)
Living people
Paralympic athletes of Spain
Paralympic bronze medalists for Spain
Paralympic athletes with a vision impairment
Paralympic medalists in athletics (track and field)
Athletes (track and field) at the 1996 Summer Paralympics
Athletes (track and field) at the 2000 Summer Paralympics
Medalists at the 1996 Summer Paralympics
Spanish male middle-distance runners
Visually impaired middle-distance runners
Paralympic middle-distance runners
20th-century Spanish people
Spanish blind people